Rajakeeya Chadarangam is a 1989 Telugu-language action film, produced by  G. Hanumantha Rao, G. Adiseshagiri Rao under the Padmalaya Studios banner, presented by Krishna and directed by P. Chandrasekhara Reddy. It stars Akkineni Nageswara Rao, Krishna and Sujatha, with music composed by Raj–Koti. The film was a remake of the Malayalam film August 1 (1988), itself loosely based on the 1971 British novel The Day of the Jackal, by Frederick Forsyth.

Plot
The story begins with the formation of the new government when an honest person, Satya Murthy (Akkineni Nageswara Rao), becomes Chief Minister of Andhra Pradesh. After that, he forms his government by selecting people with a clean image in his cabinet and brings out several revolutionary changes in the state. This overshadows Joginatham (Kota Srinivasa Rao), who is another strong aspirant for the chairs of CM and his group. They all conduct a secret meeting along with Contractor Papa Rao (Prabhakar Reddy), a political lobbyist, and decide to assassinate CM Satya Murthy. Papa Rao contacts a Professional Killer Narang (Charan Raj) to kill CM, and he keeps the deadline till 1 November. Through the intelligence bureau, Police Department gets secret information regarding it. Here they specially appoint a powerful Police officer, S. P. Pratap (Krishna), for C.M.'s protection. The rest of the story is about how S. P. Pratap protects CM from the secret killer.

Cast

Akkineni Nageswara Rao as Chief Minister Satya Murthy
Krishna as S.P. Pratap
Sujatha as Savitri 
Charan Raj as Professional Killer Narang / Ranjeet Kumar 
Nagabhushanam as President Parandhamaiah 
Gummadi as I.G. Surendra Nath
Prabhakar Reddy as Contractor Papa Rao 
M. Balaiah as D.I.G.Gupta
Kota Srinivasa Rao as Joginadham
Nutan Prasad as Thief 
Brahmanandam as Gopi
Babu Mohan as M.L.A.
Pradeep Shakthi as Jungle Jakka
Tyagaraju as Dalal
Vinod as Vinod
Eshwara Rao as Journalist Gopal
KK Sharma
Ram Mohan as M.L.A.
Chidatala Appa Rao as Butler 
Jamuna as Governor
Sangeeta as Principal 
Srilakshmi as Thief 
Priyanka

Crew
Art: Bhaskara Raju
Fights: Thyagarajan
Dialogues: Tripuraneni Maharadhi 
Music: Raj–Koti
Story: S. N. Swamy
Editing: Nageswara Rao, Satyanarayana
Cinematography: Lakshman Gore
Producer: G. Adiseshagiri Rao, G. Hanumantha Rao 
Presenter: Krishna 
Screenplay - Director: P. Chandrasekhara Reddy 
Banner: Padmalaya Studios
Release Date: 14 January 1989

References

Films scored by Raj–Koti
1980s Telugu-language films
1989 action thriller films
1989 films
Telugu remakes of Malayalam films
Indian action thriller films
Films directed by P. Chandrasekhara Reddy